James Michael Dedrick (born April 4, 1968) is an American former professional baseball player.
Dedrick was drafted by the Baltimore Orioles in the 33rd round of the 1990 MLB draft. He pitched in six games in 1995, striking out 3 and walking 6 guys in 7 and 2/3 innings.

Dedrick attended Huntington Beach High School and later Southern California College.

After his playing days, Dedrick worked briefly for Bioforce Baseball academy in Beaverton, Oregon before becoming a scout for the Arizona Diamondbacks. In 2016, he was listed as a member of the MLB scouting staff of the Pittsburgh Pirates.

External links
, or Retrosheet, or The Baseball Gauge , or Venezuela Winter League

1968 births
Living people
Akron Aeros players
American expatriate baseball players in Canada
Arizona Diamondbacks scouts
Baltimore Orioles players
Baseball players from Los Angeles
Berkshire Black Bears players
Bowie Baysox players
Buffalo Bisons (minor league) players
Frederick Keys players
Harrisburg Senators players
Kane County Cougars players
Leones del Caracas players
American expatriate baseball players in Venezuela
Major League Baseball pitchers
Oklahoma City 89ers players
Ottawa Lynx players
Pittsburgh Pirates scouts
Richmond Braves players
Rochester Red Wings players
Trenton Thunder players
Tulsa Drillers players
Vanguard Lions baseball players
Vanguard University alumni
Wausau Timbers players